Hans-Peter Jannoch (1938–2004) was a German conductor, composer and pianist.

Life 
Jannoch studied piano and composition at the Hochschule für Musik "Hanns Eisler". Afterwards he was a répétiteur at the Leipzig Opera and at the Deutsches Nationaltheater und Staatskapelle Weimar. He was a member of the "Kammerensemble Paul Dessau" (formerly: gruppe neue musik weimar). In 1983, he was awarded the Hanns Eisler Prize. In 1989, he co-founded the "ensemble unitedberlin", which also played pieces by him. He taught music theory at the Hochschule für Musik "Hanns Eisler" Berlin and is considered a sponsor of Helmut Zapf. His works have been published by Breitkopf & Härtel in Leipzig and were performed by the Staatskapelle Weimar, among others. In 2001, the composer Hermann Keller dedicated the piece "Klavierstücke für Lehrer, Kollegen und Freunde" to him.

Work 
 Appell für Vietnam (cantata)
 Divertimento für Streichorchester
 Aynn Wintrstück (chamber music)
 Freude, Freude heißt der Kreis (Choral music)
 Scherzo für Bläserquintett
 Pneuma für Orchester

Radio play 
 Totenmesse by Jörg Michael Koerbl. Dokumentation, MDR/WDR 1993.

Publication 
 Musikgeschichte, quo vadis?. In Musik und Gesellschaft 1980, issue 11,

References

External links 
 

20th-century German composers
20th-century classical composers
20th-century German male classical pianists
German conductors (music)
German music educators
Academic staff of the Hochschule für Musik Hanns Eisler Berlin
1938 births
2004 deaths
Place of birth unknown
Place of death unknown